Baculellum is a monotypic genus of flowering plants belonging to the family Asteraceae. The only species is Baculellum articulatum, and is found in South Africa.

References

Asteraceae
Monotypic Asteraceae genera